Olive Bend Little [Ollie] (May 17, 1917 − February 2, 1987) was a female pitcher who played in the All-American Girls Professional Baseball League between the  and  seasons. Listed at 5' 3", 135 lb., Little batted and threw right-handed. She was born in Poplar Point, Manitoba, Canada.

Little was renowned for her strong fastball and for pitching four no-hitter games.

As a founding member, Little entered the AAGPBL with the Rockford Peaches in 1943. She won 21 games and pitched the league's first no hitter on June 10 of that year in a nine inning game, even though she was tagged for two runs on that game. She also made the All Star team with 151 strikeouts to her credit. Little was out in 1944 to have a baby, but returned in 1945 to win 22 games. She went 14−17 in 1946, her last season.

In a three-season career, Little posted a 57−43 record with 381 strikeouts and a 2.23 ERA in 112 pitching appearances.

Little gained induction into the Manitoba Sports Hall of Fame and Museum in 1985. She died at the age of 69.

Since 1998, the Olive Little Memorial Award is presented to The Manitoba Softball Association's Top Senior Female Player.

Sources
All-American Girls Professional Baseball League Record Book – W. C. Madden. Publisher: McFarland & Company, 2000. Format: Paperback, 294pp. Language: English. . 
Women of the All-American Girls Professional Baseball League: A Biographical Dictionary - W. C. Madden. Publisher:  McFarland & Company, 2005. Format: Paperback, 295 pp. Language: English. . *Biographical Dictionary of American Sports. Vol. 3: Baseball, Q-Z - David L. Porter. Publisher: Greenwood Pub Group, 1987. Language: English. . 
Olive Little Memorial Award

External links
1943 Rockford Peaches
Olive Little’s biography at Manitoba Sports Hall of Fame and Museum
Famous Canadians

 

All-American Girls Professional Baseball League players
Canadian baseball players
Place of death unknown
1917 births
1987 deaths
Baseball people from Manitoba
20th-century American women
Canadian expatriate baseball players in the United States